Peter Willebeeck or Petrus Willebeeck (fl. 1632–1648) was a Flemish still life painter who was active in Antwerp in the second quarter of the 17th century.  He is known for his fruit still lifes, vanitas still lifes, pronkstillevens and banquet pieces executed in a very delicate manner.

Life
Virtually nothing is recorded about Willebeeck's life and training.  It is believed he was born before 1620. It is known that he was active in Antwerp from 1632 to 1648 after studying with Eduard Snayers. It is possible that he became a master in the Antwerp Guild of Saint Luke in 1646.

He was the teacher of Pieter Cosijn.

Work
Willebeeck painted fruit still lifes, vanitas still lives, pronkstillevens and banquet pieces.  The only dated work by his hand is a fruit still life dated 1647, which represents a fruit garland around a grisaille bust of Christ.  This painting was originally at the Harrach Gallery in Vienna and was last auctioned on 18 January 1983 at Christie's New York.  A vanitas still life that was at B. Koetser in 1975 is related to a work of Joris van Son dated 1652 and may have served as the model for the van Son painting.

Many of his still lifes reference the theme of vanitas and the transience of earthly glory and pleasure.  An illustration is the Still Life in the collection of the Rockox House in Antwerp.  It shows precious objects to refer to ideas of vanities and hollowness: the fallen rummer, the silver candle holder, tazza and Westerwald jug are all empty, the lighted cigar is about to go out, the pipe is finished and there is no further life in the shell.  These objects all point to the transitoriness of luxuries, the pleasures of drink and tobacco.  The peeled lemon references the bitterness of life.

Willebeeck is deemed to be a member of the circle of painters who were influenced by Jan Davidsz de Heem, a Dutch still life painter who was active in Antwerp at the same time as Willebeeck and was himself influenced by Flemish still life painters such as Frans Snyders and Daniel Seghers.

As was common in Antwerp at the time, Willebeeck collaborated with other painters, who were specialists in a particular genre.  He worked with staffage specialists on still lifes and portraits. One example of such collaboration is a painting of a garland of fruit around a female bust which he made with Erasmus Quellinus II who painted the female figure (Christie's, New York City, 26 January 2001, lot 107, not sold).

References

External links

Artists from Antwerp
Flemish Baroque painters
Flemish still life painters
Year of birth uncertain
1648 deaths